North Queensland or the Northern Region is the northern part of the Australian state of Queensland that lies just south of Far North Queensland. Queensland is a massive state, larger than many countries, and its tropical northern part has been historically remote and undeveloped, resulting in a distinctive regional character and identity.

Townsville is the largest urban centre in North Queensland, leading it to be regarded as an unofficial capital.

Geography

There is no official boundary that separates North Queensland from the rest of the state. Unofficially it is usually considered to have a southern border beginning south of the Mackay Region southern boundary, but historically it has been as far south as Rockhampton.  To the north is the Far North Queensland region,  centred on Cairns and out west is the Gulf Country.

A coastal region  centred on its largest settlement is the city of Townsville. The city is the location of a major seaport handling exports from mines in Mount Isa and cattle exports from coastal and inland areas. The region also contains a bulk sugar exporting terminal at Lucinda in the region's north. Mackay and the Burdekin region are Australia's sugar capital and produces the most sugar in Australia and is shipped at Mackay Harbour. Mackay is also one of Australia's biggest coal exporters as it is close to Queensland's major mines. Dalrymple Bay, south of Mackay is another port where coal and sugar is exported.  It also contains the inland city of Charters Towers and the coastal towns of Ayr and Ingham. The Burdekin is centred on the two towns of Ayr and Home Hill and while producing the largest amount of sugar, also produces seasonal fruit such as Lychees and Mangos in Summer/wet season.

Other communities in North Queensland include Home Hill, Sarina, Bowen, Ayr, and Proserpine.  Abbot Point, north of Bowen, is a large, coal exporting port undergoing significant expansion.

History
Gugu Badhun (also known as Koko-Badun and Kokopatun) is an Australian Aboriginal language of North Queensland. The language region includes areas within the local government area of Charters Towers Region, particularly the localities of Greenvale and the Valley of Lagoons, and in the Upper Burdekin River area and in Abergowrie.

Kuku Yalanji  (also known as Gugu Yalanji, Kuku Yalaja, and Kuku Yelandji) is an Australian Aboriginal language of the Mossman and Daintree areas of  North Queensland. The language region includes areas within the local government area of Shire of Douglas and Shire of Cook, particularly the localities of Mossman, Daintree, Bloomfield River, China Camp, Maytown, Palmer, Cape Tribulation and Wujal Wujal.

Warrgamay (also known as Waragamai, Wargamay, Wargamaygan, Biyay, and Warakamai) is an Australian Aboriginal language in North Queensland. The language region includes the Herbert River area, Ingham, Hawkins Creek, Long Pocket, Herbert Vale, Niagara Vale, Yamanic Creek, Herbert Gorge, Cardwell, Hinchinbrook Island and the adjacent mainland.

Warungu (also known as Warrungu, Warrongo, and Waroongoo.) is an Australian Aboriginal language in North Queensland. The language region includes areas from the Upper Herbert River to Mount Garnet.

Yidinji (also known as Yidinj, Yidiny, and Idindji) is an Australian Aboriginal language of North Queensland. Its traditional language region is within the local government areas of Cairns Region and Tablelands Region, in such localities as Cairns, Gordonvale, the southern part of the Atherton Tableland including Atherton and Kairi.

Yir Yiront (also known as Yiront, Jirjoront, Yir-yiront, and Kokomindjan) is an Australian Aboriginal language. Its traditional language region is in Western Cape York within the local government areas of  Aboriginal Shire of Kowanyama and Shire of Cook, in the catchments of the  Coleman River and Mitchell River. Following the removal of Aboriginal people from their traditional lands, it is also spoken in Pormpuraaw and Kowanyama.

Yuru (also known as Juru, Euronbba, Juru, Mal Mal, Malmal) is an Australian Aboriginal language spoken on Yuru country. The Yuru language region includes the landscape within the local government boundaries of the Shire of Burdekin, including the town of Home Hill.

Captain James Cook passed by the region in 1770, naming several places including Magnetic Island and Cape Cleveland.  Alan Cunningham was the first European to explore parts of the region. John Mackay explored the Pioneer Valley near Mackay in 1860.

The first settlement in the region was established at Port Denison in 1861, at what is now known as Bowen.  In 1865, the first surveys of what was to become Townsville were conducted. In 1871, gold was discovered at Charters Towers.  This led to much development for the town and for Townsville which served as a major port and service centre as both the pastoral and sugar industry spread along the coast.  Work on the Great Northern Railway from Townsville to Mount Isa began in 1879 with a small section opening the following year.

In July 1942, Japanese naval flying boats conducted air raids on Townsville.

The Perc Tucker Regional Gallery was established at Townsville in 1981 and the TYTO Regional Art Gallery at Ingham opened in 2011.

Tourism 

The region has a number of significant tourist attractions including the Great Barrier Reef and reef islands, rainforests in the Wet Tropics of Queensland, Eungella, Magnetic Island, and the Whitsunday Islands. The region has 36 national parks.

Transport 

The region is serviced by Townsville Airport which is ranked as the 11th busiest airport in Australia.  The airport was granted international status in 1980.  Along the coast, the Bruce Highway passes from the south through to the north of the region.  The Flinders Highway links Townsville with Charters Towers and the Peak Downs Highway extends west from Mackay.

Proposed State of North Queensland

Throughout the years, there have been many calls for the formation of a new state. Many proposals have been drawn up, regarding the borders, name and the debate over which town will become the capital.

See also

 List of schools in North Queensland

References